The Keeper of the Privy Purse and Treasurer to the King/Queen (or Financial Secretary to the King/Queen) is responsible for the financial management of the Royal Household of the Sovereign of the United Kingdom. The officeholder is assisted by the Deputy Treasurer to the King/Queen for the management of the Sovereign Grant, currently Sally O'Neill (formerly Chief Operating Officer of the Royal Opera House). 

The officeholder is also assisted by the Deputy Keeper of the Privy Purse for semi-private concerns, such as racing stables, the Royal Philatelic Collection, Royal Ascot, the Chapel Royal, the Page of Honour, Military Knights of Windsor, Royal Maundy, the  Royal Victorian Order, grace and favour apartments, and the Duchy of Lancaster. These are funded from the Privy Purse, which is drawn largely from the Duchy of Lancaster and the Duchy of Cornwall.

The Keeper of the Privy Purse meets the Sovereign at least weekly. Among the duties is the allocation of grace and favour apartments at the royal palaces. The current Keeper of the Privy Purse and Treasurer to the King is Sir Michael Stevens.

At coronations in recent centuries, the holders of this office have invariably carried a ceremonial purse, embroidered with the royal coat of arms.

List of Keepers of the Privy Purse

Henry VIII
 Henry Norris by 1526–?1536 (executed 1536)
 Anthony Denny c. 1536

Edward VI
Peter Osborne 1551–1552

Elizabeth I
John Tamworth, 1559–1569
Henry Seckford 1559–1603

James I
Sir Richard Molyneux, 1st Baronet, 1607–?
George Home, 1st Earl of Dunbar, c. 1610–1611
John Murray, 1st Earl of Annandale 1611–1616

Charles I
Richard Molyneux, 1st Viscount Molyneux, PC 1616?–1636
Robert Carr, 1st Earl of Ancram, PC 1636?–1639

Charles II
Henry Bennet, 1st Earl of Arlington, KG, PC (1661–1662)
Charles Berkeley, 1st Earl of Falmouth, PC 1662–1665
Baptist May 1665–1685

James II
James Graham, 1685–1689

William III
William Bentinck, 1st Earl of Portland, KG, PC 1689–1700
Caspar Frederick Henning, 1700–1702

Anne
Sarah Churchill, Duchess of Marlborough 1702–1711
Abigail Masham, Baroness Masham 1711–1714

George I
Caspar Frederick Henning, 1714–1727

George II
Augustus Schutz, 1727–1757
The Honourable Edward Finch, 1757–1760

George III
John Stuart, 3rd Earl of Bute, KG, PC 1760–1763
William Breton, 1763–1773
James Brudenell, 5th Earl of Cardigan, PC 1773–1811
The Right Honourable Colonel Sir John McMahon, 1st Baronet, 1812–1817
Lieutenant-General Benjamin Bloomfield, 1st Baron Bloomfield, GCB GCH PC 1817–1822

George IV
The Right Honourable Sir William Knighton, 1st Baronet, GCH 1821–1830

William IV
Major-General Sir Henry Wheatley, 1st Baronet, GCH, CB 1830–1846

Victoria
George Edward Anson 1847–1849
Colonel The Honourable Sir Charles Beaumont Phipps KCB 1849–1866
General The Honourable Sir Charles Grey 1866–1867 (jointly)
Colonel Thomas Myddleton-Biddulph KCB 1866–1878 (jointly to 1867)
Major-General Sir Henry Ponsonby GCB 1878–1895
The Right Honourable Lieutenant-Colonel Sir Fleetwood Edwards GCVO, KCB, ISO 1895–1901

Edward VII
The Right Honourable General Sir Dighton Probyn, VC, GCB, GCSI, GCVO, ISO 1901–1910

George V
The Right Honourable Lieutenant-Colonel Sir William Carington GCVO KCB JP 1910–1914
Lieutenant-Colonel Frederick Ponsonby, 1st Baron Sysonby GCB GCVO PC 1914–1935
Colonel Clive Wigram, 1st Baron Wigram GCB GCVO CSI PC 1935–1936

George VI
Major Sir Ulick Alexander 19361952

Elizabeth II
Brigadier The Right Honourable Charles Tryon, 2nd Baron Tryon, GCVO, KCB, DSO, DL, OStJ 1952–1971
Major Sir Rennie Maudslay, GCVO KCB MBE 1971–1981
Sir Peter Miles, KCVO 1981–1987
Major Sir Shane Blewitt, GCVO 1988–1996
Sir Michael Peat, GCVO 1996–2002 
Sir Alan Reid, GCVO 2002–2017
Sir Michael Stevens KCVO 2018–2022

Charles III
Sir Michael Stevens KCVO 2022–present

Deputies

Deputy Keepers 
This list is not complete.

 1922–1925: Paymaster Rear-Admiral Sir John Henry George Chapple, KCB, CVO, RN
 1985–1988: Major Sir Shane Gabriel Basil Blewitt, GCVO
 1988–2002: Sir John Christopher Parsons, KCVO, FCA, FIC
 2002–?: Harold Smith
 ?–2011: Ian Donald McGregor, CVO
 2011–2017: Sir Michael John Stevens, KCVO
 2017-present: Sally O'Neill

Deputy Treasurers 

 1923–1935: Sir Ralph Endersby Harwood, KCB, KCVO, CBE
 1941–1958: Commander Sir Dudley Colles, KCB, KCVO, OBE, RN
 1958–1968: Commander Sir Philip John Row, KCVO, OBE, RN
 1969–1985: Sir Russell Dillon Wood, KCVO, VRD
 1988–2002: Sir John Christopher Parsons, KCVO, FCA, FIC
 2003–2007: Stephen Ingleby Cawley, CVO, FCA
 2007–2017: Sir Michael John Stevens, KCVO
 2017-present: Sally O'Neill

See also
Treasurer of the Household

References

Positions within the British Royal Household
Ceremonial officers in the United Kingdom